Burgos, officially the Municipality of Burgos, is a 5th class municipality in the province of Ilocos Norte, Philippines. According to the 2020 census, it has a population of 10,759 people.

It was formerly known as Nagpartian and was renamed after the martyred priest José Burgos who was born in the Ilocos Region. It is home of the century-old Cape Bojeador Lighthouse.

History 
The town was first known as Nagparitan, the early inhabitants were called Mumburi and known as a wild and fierce people who prevented the Christianized natives from settling in the vicinity. When the Spaniards came to the area, the people staged a revolt, captured the priest and mutilated his body. Because of this incident, the Spaniards change the name of Nagparitan, meaning prohibit, to Nagpartian which means the place of slaughter.

On October 15, 1903, Nagpartian was then fused with the municipality of Bangui because of the unstable condition due to low collection of government taxes. In 1912, Executive Order No. 87 was issued to separate Nagpartian from Bangui; the change took effect on January 1, 1913. On February 28, 1914, by virtue of Act No. 2390, Nagpartian was renamed Burgos in honor of one of the three martyred priests, Fr. José Burgos. Seńor Juan Ignacio was the first Presidente Municipal of the town.

Majority of people in the municipality are engaged in the production of commercial crops like rice, garlic, tomato, mongo and corn. However, aside from producing agricultural products, most of them also venture into fishing, livestock and swine-raisin, rice milling, and cottage industries like furniture and hollow-blocks making, smelting, salt-making, and mat weaving.

The town is endowed with scenic and tourist-attracting shores or coastline – from plain white beaches in Barangays. Paayas and Bobon to rugged and sharp cliffs naturally formed through the centuries like Gagamtan Cliff in Barangay Bayog, and Kapur-purawan Cliff in Barangay Saoit. The Digging Falls is another pride of the town, with a beautiful cascade at the boundary of Barangays Ablan and Buduan, certainly a perfect place for local and foreign tourist to spend their summer escapade.

Another worth-mentioning tourist attraction is the historic Cape Bojeador Lighthouse, built during the latter part of the 19th century. Located on a top of a hill overlooking the vast expanse of the China Sea, it serves as a beacon light to passing ships and to local fishermen. Because of its high elevation, it offers travelers with a panoramic view of the rugged coastline of Burgos.

Geography 
Burgos is bounded to the north by South China Sea; Bangui in the east and in the south, Pasuquin and Vintar. It is situated in the north coast of Ilocos Norte. Burgos has the largest wind farm in the Philippines.

Barangays 
Burgos is politically subdivided into 11 barangays. These barangays are headed by elected officials: Barangay Captain, Barangay Council, whose members are called Barangay Councilors. All are elected every three years.

 Ablan (Buraan)
 Agaga
 Bayog
 Bobon
 Buduan (Malituek)
 Nagsurot
 Paayas
 Pagali
 Poblacion (Ili)
 Saoit
 Tanap

Climate

Demographics

Economy

Government 
Burgos, belonging to the first congressional district of the province of Ilocos Norte, is governed by a mayor designated as its local chief executive and by a municipal council as its legislative body in accordance with the Local Government Code. The mayor, vice mayor, and the councilors are elected directly by the people through an election which is being held every three years.

Elected officials

Municipal seal 

Shield, derived from the Provincial Seal of Ilocos Norte.
Lighthouse, represents the Cape Bojeador Lighthouse, the main tourist attraction in the town.
Light, serves as guide to shipping vessels cruising the China Sea.
Mountain and Sea, depict the geographical location and the territorial limits of the municipality.

See also
List of renamed cities and municipalities in the Philippines

References

External links

[ Philippine Standard Geographic Code]
Philippine Census Information
Local Governance Performance Management System

Municipalities of Ilocos Norte